Piophila is a genus of small flies which includes the species known as the cheese fly. Both Piophila species feed on carrion, including human corpses.

Description
Piophila are small dark flies with unmarked wings. The setulae (fine hairs) on the thorax are confined to three distinct rows.

Species
There are two species in the genus Piophila:
Piophila casei (Linnaeus, 1758), the cheese fly
Piophila megastigmata J. McAlpine, 1978

References 

Tephritoidea genera
Piophilidae
Space-flown life